Centel Corporation was an American telecommunications company, with primary interests in providing basic telephone service, cellular phone service and cable television service.

Early history
In 1900,  Max McGraw took his savings from his newspaper route to start an electrical repair and supply shop, the McGraw Electric Company, in Sioux City, Iowa. Over the years, McGraw's company grew from residential wiring installation to include industrial wiring, electrical supply wholesaling, and electronics manufacturing. In 1922, McGraw entered the telecommunications business with the purchase of Central Telephone and Electric Company of St. Louis, Missouri. McGraw's businesses grew rapidly, and in 1926 more than 20 separate electric and telephone companies were consolidated as Central West Public Service Company.

Through a series of mergers, acquisitions, purchases, sales, and re-purchases, the electrical supply and manufacturing side of the business would form the nucleus of McGraw-Edison. Through similar processes, the telecommunications side would become Centel, which became the name of the company in 1982.

Centel
Centel provided telephone service through its Central Telephone Company subsidiary. Its largest coverage areas by lines installed were Las Vegas, Chicago suburbs (Des Plaines, Park Ridge and unincorporated Cook County just outside the village limits of Northbrook, Glenview and Niles), Tallahassee, FL and Charlottesville, VA.  It was, until the breakup of AT&T in 1984, the fifth largest telephone company in the United States after AT&T, GTE, United Telecom and Contel.

Centel also owned a stake in Keyfax, a teletext/videotex service operating in the Chicago area, alongside Honeywell and Field Enterprises. The service was discontinued by 1986.

Centel sold its cable operations in 1989. Centel sold its electric operations in 1991 to UtiliCorp United.

Centel had consolidated revenues of $1.2 billion in 1991.

Centel was purchased by Sprint in 1993 for approximately $3 billion in Sprint common stock.  Centel's stock was trading at $42.50 per share on the New York Stock Exchange just before the merger announcement in May 1992, but the cash value of the deal (commonly referred to as a “takeunder”) worked out to be only $33.50 per share of Centel stock.  After a bitter battle with dissident shareholders who believed the company was worth more,  the merger was ultimately approved by a very narrow majority, with 50.5% of the outstanding shares voting for the merger.

At the time of its 1993 purchase by Sprint, Centel provided local telephone service to 1.5 million telephone lines in seven states and was also the 10th largest cellular company with operations in 22 states.  It had 9,300 employees. 

Ironically, Sprint did not end up keeping either of Centel's businesses (cellular and local telephone service) that it acquired. The cellular operations were spun off in 1996 so Sprint could instead focus on providing Sprint PCS cellular service.  The local telephone operations were spun off (after being combined with Sprint's own local telephone operations) in 2006 (see below).

Former subsidiaries
Remaining network and assets are operated and maintained by Centurylink/Lumen Technologies.
Central Telephone Company: In 2006, Sprint spun off the former Centel telephone subsidiaries (which Sprint merged with its own United Telephone operations) as part of the formation of Embarq. Embarq was acquired by CenturyTel (then CenturyLink, currently Lumen Technologies) in 2009. Central Telephone, Central Telephone Company of Virginia, and Central Telephone Company of Texas are still active CenturyLink subsidiaries.
Earlier, in 1997, Sprint sold the Chicago area phone operations (Des Plaines and Park Ridge) to Ameritech (now AT&T). Additionally, operations in Iowa and Minnesota were sold to Frontier Communications in 1991, and in Ohio to CenturyTel in 1992, thus the Ohio operations, by this point CenturyTel of Ohio, would reunite with most of the other Centel operating companies in 2009.
Centel Cellular Company: In 1993, Centel Cellular Company changed its name to Sprint Cellular Company when Sprint acquired Centel. It was subsequently spun off as 360 Communications Company in 1996.  Alltel acquired 360 Communications Company in 1998 for $4.1 billion. Verizon Wireless acquired Alltel in 2008.
Centel Cable Television (was the nation's 22nd largest cable company):  In 1989, Centel sold all of its cable operations in 6 separate transactions.  Southeast Florida operations were sold to Adelphia Communications, which later sold to Time Warner Cable, which later sold the properties to Comcast, Ohio operations to Warner Cable (then Time Warner Cable, later to Charter Communications), Central Florida operations to American Television and Communications Corporation (a subsidiary of Time Inc., then Time Warner Cable, later to be spun off as Bright House Networks, and ultimately acquired by Charter Communications), Kentucky operations to Simmons Communications (later to Frontiervision, then Adelphia, then Time Warner Cable, and ultimately Charter Communications), Michigan operations to C-TEC (later Michigan Cable, then Avalon Cable, then Charter Communications) and Illinois operations to Jones Intercable (then taken over by Comcast) for a combined total of $1.4 billion.  The price yielded a net gain of over $500 million to Centel.
Centel Electric: In 1991, Centel sold its electric utility holdings in Kansas and Colorado to UtiliCorp (later known as Aquila, Inc.) for $345 million.  In 2006, Aquila sold the Kansas electric properties to Mid-Kansas Electric Company (a cooperative).  In 2008, the Colorado electric properties were acquired by Black Hills Corporation.

Notes

Sprint Corporation
Lumen Technologies
Charter Communications
Telecommunications companies disestablished in 1993
Defunct companies based in Chicago
Defunct telecommunications companies of the United States
Telecommunications companies established in 1900
American companies established in 1900
1900 establishments in Iowa
1993 disestablishments in Illinois